National Tertiary Route 303, or just Route 303 (or ) is a National Road Route of Costa Rica, located in the San José province.

Description
In San José province the route covers Tarrazú canton (San Marcos, San Lorenzo, San Carlos districts).

References

Highways in Costa Rica